The Blueshirts (Camicie Azzurre) was the paramilitary wing of the Italian Nationalist Association.

References 

Paramilitary organisations based in Italy
Italian Nationalist Association
Military wings of fascist parties
Clothing in politics